Quirijn is a Dutch masculine given name. It is a form of Quirinus. The name Quirinus became popular in the Low Countries due to the veneration of Saint Quirinus of Neuss. The name took many different forms from the 15th century on: Corijn, Crijn, Krijn, Quirijn and Quiringh. Among female versions are Krijntje and Quirine. People with these names include:

Quirijn
Quirijn Boel (1620–1668), Flemish engraver
Quirijn van Brekelenkam (c.1625–c.1670), Dutch genre painter
Quirijn Jansz Damast (1580–1638), Dutch linen weaver and mayor of Haarlem
Quirijn Gunning (born 1991), Dutch cricketer
 (1787–1860), Dutch navy officer, writer, painter and entomologist
Crijn / Krijn
Krijn, name given to a Neanderthal man, whose fossil was discovered off the Dutch coast
 (born 1941), Dutch actor and television director
 (1917–1943), Dutch resistance fighter in World War II
Crijn Fredericks, chief engineer of the New Netherland colony in 1625 and 1626
Crijn Hendricksz Volmarijn (1601–1645), Dutch painter
 (1940–2006), Dutch radio presenter

Quirine
Quirine Lemoine (born 1991), Dutch tennis player
Quirine Oosterveld (born 1990), Dutch volleyball player
 (born 1972), Dutch cellist

References

Dutch masculine given names